The Jessie Osborne House is a house near Jerome, Idaho that was listed on the National Register of Historic Places in 1983. It is an example of the simple rectangular gable-roofed houses built on farms in this area of Idaho.  It is unique in that it has not been changed, added on to or enlarged. It was built by master stonemason H.T. Pugh and by Paul Kartsky.

See also
 List of National Historic Landmarks in Idaho
 National Register of Historic Places listings in Jerome County, Idaho

References

1919 establishments in Idaho
Houses completed in 1919
Houses in Jerome County, Idaho
Houses on the National Register of Historic Places in Idaho
National Register of Historic Places in Jerome County, Idaho